The 1995–96 SK Rapid Wien season was the 98th season in club history.

Squad statistics

Fixtures and results

Bundesliga

League table

Cup

Austrian Supercup

Cup Winners' Cup

References

1995-96 Rapid Wien Season
Austrian football clubs 1995–96 season
Austrian football championship-winning seasons